Henkin is a Jewish last name and may refer to the following people:

 Leon Henkin, logician and mathematician
 Henkin quantifier, a concept he pioneered
 Gennadi Henkin, mathematician
 William A. Henkin, psychotherapist and sex therapist
 Yosef Eliyahu Henkin, Orthodox rabbi
 Louis Henkin, legal academician and writer
 Yehudah Herzl Henkin, Orthodox rabbi, nephew of Louis Henkin and grandson of Yosef Eliyahu Henkin
 Eitam and Na'ama Henkin, American-Israeli couple killed in a terror attack in 2015
 Hilary Henkin, American screenwriter and producer
 Evgeny and Yakov Henkin, 1930s street photographers in Berlin and Leningrad (St. Petersburg)
 Vladimir Ya. Henkin, Russian and Soviet stage and screen actor and comic, People's Artist of the RSFSR
 Victor Henkin, singer and dramatic actor  
 Kirill V. Henkin, Soviet and dissident public figure, secret agent, writer, journalist and long-term contributor to Radio Liberty 
 Lauren Henkin, visual artist and landscape photographer